Thurmann  may refer to:

 42191 Thurmann, a main-belt asteroid
 Karl Thurmann (1909–1943), German U-boat commander
 Thurmann (family name), a Norwegian family name

See also

 Thurman (disambiguation)